The name Gaston has been used for four tropical cyclones in the Atlantic Ocean.
 Hurricane Gaston (2004), caused heavy flooding in Richmond, Virginia.
 Tropical Storm Gaston (2010), short-lived tropical storm that dissipated before reaching land. 
 Hurricane Gaston (2016), long-lived category 3 hurricane that churned in the open ocean.
 Tropical Storm Gaston (2022), formed in the middle of the ocean without affecting land.

Gaston